Xerocrassa derogata is a species of air-breathing land snail, a pulmonate gastropod mollusk in the family Geomitridae.

Distribution

This species is endemic to Spain, where it occurs in the provinces of Alicante, Valencia and Murcia.

References

 Rossmässler, E. A. (1854-1858). Iconographie der Land- & Süßwasser-Mollusken Europa's, mit vorzüglicher Berücksichtigung kritischer und noch nicht abgebildeter Arten
 Bank, R. A.; Neubert, E. (2017). Checklist of the land and freshwater Gastropoda of Europe. Last update: July 16th, 2017

derogata
Gastropods of Europe
Endemic fauna of Spain
Gastropods described in 1854